The Standard Written Form or SWF of the Cornish language is an orthography standard that is designed to "provide public bodies and the educational system with a universally acceptable, inclusive, and neutral orthography". It was the outcome of a process initiated by the creation of the public body Cornish Language Partnership, which identified a need to agree on a single standard orthography in order to end previous orthographical disagreements, secure government funding, and increase the use of Cornish in Cornwall.

The new form was agreed in May 2008 after two years of negotiations, and was influenced by all the previous orthographies. The negotiating teams comprised members of all the main Cornish language groups, Kesva an Taves Kernewek, Kowethas an Yeth Kernewek, Agan Tavas, and Cussel an Tavas Kernuak, and received input from experts and academics from Europe and the United States. The agreement meant that Cornish became officially accepted and funded, with support from the UK government and the European Union.

In June 2009, the Gorsedh Kernow voted overwhelmingly to adopt the Standard Written Form.

In 2013, the SWF was reviewed in a process intended to identify problems and issues with the orthography. A small number of changes were made to the SWF, which made the orthography easier for learners and went some way to reducing the spelling difference between dialects.

Orthography
The Standard Written Form recognises Revived Middle Cornish (RMC), Tudor Cornish (TC), and Revived Late Cornish (RLC) as variants of equal standing on which it bases its system. The original 2008 Specification states that "[t]he orthography as a whole leans toward a Middle Cornish base, since in many cases the correct RLC or TC pronunciation can be deduced from an RMC form, but not vice versa".

Monophthongs 
Unstressed vowels are always short. Stressed vowels in monosyllables are long when followed by a single consonant or by nothing, e.g. gwag RMC [gwaːg], RLC [gwæːg] "empty", lo RMC [lɔː], RLC [loː] "spoon", and short when followed by a double consonant or a consonant cluster, e.g. ass RMC [as], RLC [æs] "how"; hons RMC [hɔns], RLC [hɔnz] "yonder". Exceptions are that long vowels precede st, e.g. lost RMC & RLC [lɔːst] "tail", and also sk and sp in RMC, e.g. Pask [paːsk] "Easter". Stressed vowels in polysyllables are short except in the case of conservative RMC speakers, who may pronounce vowels long before single consonants and st (and, for some, sk and sp), e.g. gwagen RMC [gwa(ː)gɛn], RLC [gwægɐn] "a blank".

{| class="wikitable"
! rowspan="2" | Letter
! colspan="2" | RMC
! colspan="2" | TC & RLC
|-
! Short
! Long
! Short
! Long
|-
| align="center" |a
| align="center" |[a]
| align="center" |[aː]
| align="center" |[æ]
| align="center" |[æː]
|-
| align="center" |e
| align="center" |[ɛ]
| align="center" |[ɛː]
| align="center" |[ɛ]
| align="center" |[eː]
|-
| align="center" |eu
| align="center" |[œ]
| align="center" |[øː]
| align="center" |[ɛ]
| align="center" |[eː]
|-
| align="center" |i
| align="center" |[i]
| align="center" |[iː]
| align="center" |[ɪ]
| align="center" |[iː]
|-
| align="center" |o
| align="center" |[ɔ], [ɤ]
| align="center" |[ɔː]
| align="center" |[ɔ], [ɤ]
| align="center" |[oː]
|-
| align="center" |oa
| align="center" |-
| align="center" |-
| align="center" |-
| align="center" |[ɒː]
|-
| align="center" |oo 
| align="center" |-
| align="center" |[oː]
| align="center" |-
| align="center" |[oː], [uː]
|-
| align="center" |ou
| align="center" |[u]
| align="center" |[uː]
| align="center" |[ʊ]
| align="center" |[uː]
|-
| align="center" |u
| align="center" |[ʏ]
| align="center" |[yː]
| align="center" |[ɪ]
| align="center" |[iː]
|-
| align="center" |y
| align="center" |[ɪ]
| align="center" |[ɪː]
| align="center" |[ɪ]
| align="center" |[iː]
|}

May be reduced to [ɐ] when unstressed, which is given as [ə] in the original Specification but as [ɐ] in the updated online dictionary.

Unrounded to [ɛ] when unstressed.

Given as [œ] in the original Specification but as [øː] in the updated online dictionary.

Often realised as [əɪ] in RLC in stressed open syllables, in which case it is written with the variant graph ei.

Can either represent [ɔ], the short version of long o [ɔː/oː], or [ɤ], the short counterpart to oo [oː/uː]. When representing [ɤ], the 2013 Review suggests o could be written as ò for clarity in "dictionaries and teaching materials".

Used as a variant graph by RLC speakers in a few words where RMC and TC speakers use long a, [aː] and [æː] respectively. After the 2013 Review, used solely in boas "be", broas "big", doas "come", moas "go", and their derivatives.

Used in word only when both Kernewek Kemmyn (KK) writes oe and RLC realises the sound [uː]. Therefore, oo does not always correspond to KK, e.g. SWF loor, KK loer "moon" both [loːr], but SWF hwor [ʍɔːr], KK hwoer [hwoːr] "sister". This is because evidence suggests the second group of words with o underwent a different phonological development to the first group with oe.

Pronounced solely as [uː] in RLC.

Given as [y] in the original Specification but as [ʏ] in the updated online dictionary. Reduced to [ɪ] when unstressed.

Changed to [ɪʊ] when stressed and word-final or before gh. In a small number of words, u can represent [ʊ] when short or [uː] or [ɪʊ] when long in TC and RLC. The 2013 Review recommends these be spelt optionally as ù and û respectively in "dictionaries and teaching materials".

Can be pronounced [ɛ, eː] and therefore spelt e in TC and RLC.

Diphthongs 
{|class="wikitable"
! Letter
! RMC
! TC
! RLC
|-
|align="center"|aw
|align="center"|[aʊ]
|colspan=2 align="center"|[æʊ]
|-
|align="center"|ay
|align="center"|[aɪ]
|colspan=2 align="center"|[əɪ], [ɛː]
|-
|align="center"|ei
|colspan=2 align="center"|
|align="center"|[əɪ]
|-
|align="center"|ew
|colspan=3 align="center"|[ɛʊ]
|-
|align="center"|ey
|align="center"|[ɛɪ]
|colspan=2 align="center"|[əɪ]
|-
|align="center"|iw
|align="center"|[iʊ]
|colspan=2 align="center"|[ɪʊ]
|-
|align="center"|ow
|colspan=2 align="center"|[ɔʊ]
|align="center"|[ɔʊ], [uː]
|-
|align="center"|oy
|colspan=3 align="center"|[ɔɪ]
|-
|align="center"|uw
|align="center"|[ʏʊ]
|colspan=2 align="center"|[ɪʊ]
|-
|align="center"|yw
|colspan=2 align="center"|[ɪʊ]
|align="center"|[ɛʊ]
|}

 Loanword spelt with aw are often pronounced [ɒ(ː)] in TC and RLC.

 Used as a variant graph by RLC when i is diphthongised to [əɪ] in stressed open syllables.

 Used in hiatus.

 A few monosyllables may keep the more conservative pronunciation [ʊɪ] in RLC, e.g. moy [mʊɪ] "more", oy [ʊɪ] "egg".

 Given as [yʊ] in the original Specification but as [ʏʊ] in the updated online dictionary.

 The variant graph ew may be used instead of yw to represent the pronunciation [ɛʊ].

Consonants 

{|class="wikitable"
! Letter
! RMC
! TC
! RLC
|-
|align="center"|b
|colspan=3 align="center"|[b]
|-
|align="center"|c
|colspan=3 align="center"|[s]
|-
|align="center"|cch
| align="center" |[tʃː]
|colspan=2 align="center"|[tʃ]
|-
|align="center"|ch
|colspan=3 align="center"|[tʃ]
|-
| align="center" |ck
|align="center"|[kː], [k]
|colspan=2 align="center"|[k]
|-
| align="center" |cy
|align="center"|[sj]
|colspan=2 align="center"|[ʃ(j)]
|-
|align="center"|d
|colspan=3 align="center"|[d]
|-
|align="center"|dh
|align="center"|[ð]
|align="center"|[ð], [θ]
|align="center"|[ð]
|-
|align="center"|f
|colspan=2 align="center"|[f]
|align="center"|[f], [v]
|-
|align="center"|ff
|align="center"|[fː]
|colspan=2 align="center"|[f]
|-
|align="center"|g
|colspan=3 align="center"|[ɡ]
|-
|align="center"|gh
|colspan=2 align="center"|[x]
|align="center"|[h]
|-
|align="center"|ggh
|align="center"|[xː]
|colspan=2 align="center"|[h]
|-
|align="center"|h
|colspan=3 align="center"|[h]
|-
|align="center"|hw
|colspan=3 align="center"|[ʍ]
|-
|align="center"|j
|colspan=3 align="center"|[dʒ]
|-
|align="center"|k
|colspan=3 align="center"|[k]
|-
|align="center"|kk
|align="center"|[kː]
|colspan=2 align="center"|[k]
|-
|align="center"|ks
|colspan=3 align="center"|[ks], [gz]
|-
|align="center"|l
|colspan=3 align="center"|[l]
|-
|align="center"|ll
|align="center"|[lː]
| align="center"|[lʰ], [l]
|align="center"|[lʰ]
|-
|align="center"|m
|colspan=3 align="center"|[m]
|-
|align="center"|mm
|align="center"|[mː]
|align="center" |[m]
|align="center" |[ᵇm]
|-
|align="center"|n
|colspan=3 align="center"|[n]
|-
|align="center"|nn
|align="center"|[nː]
| align="center"|[nʰ], [n]
| align="center"|[ᵈn]
|-
|align="center"|p
|colspan=3 align="center"|[p]
|-
|align="center"|pp
|align="center"|[pː]
|colspan=2 align="center"|[p]
|-
|align="center"|r
|align="center"|[r]
|align="center"|[ɹ]
|align="center"|[ɹ],[ɾ]
|-
|align="center"|rr
|align="center"|[rː]
| align="center"|[ɾʰ], [ɹ]
|align="center"|[ɾʰ]
|-
|align="center"|s
|colspan=3 align="center"|[s], [z]
|-
|align="center"|sh
|colspan=3 align="center"|[ʃ]
|-
|align="center"|ss
|align="center"|[sː], [s]
|colspan=2 align="center"|[s]
|-
|align="center"|ssh
|align="center"|[ʃː]
|colspan=2 align="center"|[ʃ]
|-
|align="center"|t
|colspan=3 align="center"|[t]
|-
|align="center"|th
|colspan=3 align="center"|[θ]
|-
|align="center"|tt
|align="center"|[tː]
|colspan=2 align="center"|[t]
|-
|align="center"|tth
|align="center"|[θː]
|colspan=2 align="center"|[θ]
|-
|align="center"|v
|align="center"|[v]
|align="center"|[v], [f]
|align="center"|[v]
|-
|align="center"|w
|colspan=3 align="center"|[w]
|-
|align="center"|y
|colspan=3 align="center"|[j]
|-
|align="center"|z
|colspan=3 align="center"|[z]
|}

Used solely in words whose status as borrowings is in no doubt.

In certain borrowed words, such as fondacyon RMC [fɔnˈdasjɔn], RLC [fənˈdæʃjɐn] "foundation".

TC speakers realise dh as [θ] and v as [f] word-finally in an unstressed syllable. RLC speakers may not even realise these sounds at all, although this is reflected in spelling, e.g. TC menedh [ˈmɛnɐθ], RLC mena [ˈmɛnɐ] "mountain".

[v] often occurs morpheme-initially before vowels. The mutation of [f] to [v] found in some varieties of Cornish is not shown in writing.

A few words spelt with mm and nn lack pre-occlusion in RLC. These include words thought to have entered the language after pre-occlusion occurred, e.g. gramm "gramme", and words that fell out of use by the RLC period, e.g. gonn "I know".

The distribution of [s] and [z] differs in each variety of Cornish. Some rules are common to almost all speakers, e.g. final s and medial s between vowels or a sonorant and a vowel are usually [z], whereas other rules are specific to certain varieties, e.g. RMC speakers usually realise initial s as [s] whereas RLC tend to prefer [z] (except in such clusters as sk, sl, sn, sp and st). The mutation of [s] to [z] found in some varieties of Cornish is not shown in writing. As an example, Penn Sans has been transliterated into English as Penzance reflecting pronunciation.

Alternative letters 
At times, the various varieties of revived Cornish differ in their pronunciation of sounds. A number of strategies are employed in the Standard Written Form to deal with these differences and make the system usable for all.

Umbrella graphs 
When a RMC sound is a consistently a single different sound in RLC, the SWF uses what it terms umbrella graphs.
{| class="wikitable"
! Letter
! RMC
! RLC
|-
| align="center" |eu
| align="center" |[œ], [øː]
| align="center" |[ɛ], [eː]
|-
| align="center" |gh
| align="center" |[x]
| align="center" |[h]
|-
| align="center" |oo
| align="center" |[oː]
| align="center" |[uː]
|-
| align="center" |u
| align="center" |[ʏ], [yː]
| align="center" |[ɪ], [iː]
|}

Variant graphs 
Where an umbrella graph is considered unworkable, variant graphs may be used to spell a word. The SWF does not stipulate that either only RMC or RLC variant graphs must be used, for instance, a typical TC speaker will choose the letters that best reflect their own pronunciation.
{| class="wikitable"
! colspan="2" | RMC
! colspan="2" | RLC
|-
! Letter
! Pronunciation
! Letter
! Pronunciation
|-
| align="center" |a
| align="center" |[aː]
| align="center" |oa
| align="center" |[ɒː] 
|-
| align="center" |ew
| align="center" |[ɛʊ]
| align="center" |ow
| align="center" |[ɔʊ]
|-
| align="center" |i
| align="center" |[i]
| align="center" |ei
| align="center" |[əɪ]
|-
| align="center" |mm
| align="center" |[mː]
| align="center" |bm
| align="center" |[ᵇm]
|-
| align="center" |nn
| align="center" |[nː]
| align="center" |dn
| align="center" |[ᵈn]
|-
| align="center" |s
| align="center" |[s], [z]
| align="center" |j
| align="center" |[dʒ]
|-
| align="center" |y
| align="center" |[ɪ], [ɪː]
| align="center" |e
| align="center" |[ɛ], [eː]
|}

Traditional graphs 
A third set of alternative letters is the traditional graphs. As the name implies, these spellings are closer to those traditionally employed by Cornish writers, and so are preferred by some Cornish speakers today. Although traditional graphs are considered correct and may be used freely by individuals, they are unlike variant graphs in that they do not have equal standing with standard graphs and "will not appear in elementary language textbooks or in official documents produced by public bodies".

{| class="wikitable"
! Standard
! Traditional
|-
| align="center" |hw
| align="center" |wh
|-
| align="center" |i
| align="center" |y
|-
| align="center" |k
| align="center" |c
|-
| align="center" |ks
| align="center" |x
|-
| align="center" |kw
| align="center" |qw
|}

 When unstressed and word final

 Before a, l, o, r and u

See also
 Unified Cornish
 Kernewek Kemmyn
 Modern Cornish
 Kernowek Standard

References

External links
 Standard Written Form, Cornish Language Partnership
 , Cornish Language Partnership
 SWF Dictionary (2012)

Cornish language
Latin-script orthographies